Goksjø is a lake in the municipalities of Sandefjord, Larvik and Andebu in Vestfold og Telemark county, Norway. Goksjø is 5 km from north to south, and has a circumference of 20 km. At its deepest, Goksjø is no deeper than 26 meters. Goksjø has an elevation of 28 meters above sea level.  It is the largest lake in Sandefjord, and the third-largest in Vestfold County. It is surrounded by rural agricultural lands, and flooding occurs on a regular basis.

The lake is used for ice-skating, canoeing, swimming, fishing, and other recreational activities.

The name derives from Gautsjór from the male name Gautr, which may have become Gok. 

Both draining rivers and inlets are located on the lake's northern shore. Storelv and Skorgeelva (Trollsåselva) are the two most important inlets. It is drained solely by Hagneselva, which flows into Åsrumvannet and eventually into Numedalslågen. Its most important inlet is the river Storelv, which flows from Askimvannet in Andebu.

Fish species found here include Northern pike, European perch, Ide, Common dace, European eel, Salmon and Brown trout.

References

Books

See also
List of lakes in Norway

Lakes of Vestfold og Telemark